Lampruna rubridorsata is a moth of the subfamily Arctiinae. It was described by Hervé de Toulgoët and Jocelyne Navatte in 1996. It is found in Ecuador.

References

Moths described in 1996
Phaegopterina
Moths of South America